Milazzo is a municipality in the Metropolitan City of Messina, Sicily, southern Italy; it is the largest commune in the Metropolitan City after Messina and Barcellona Pozzo di Gotto. The town has a population of around 31,500 inhabitants.

History
Several civilizations settled in Milazzo and left signs of their presence from the Neolithic age. In Homer's Odyssey Milazzo is presumably the place where Ulysses is shipwrecked and meets Polyphemus.

Historically, the town originated as the ancient Mylae, an outpost of Zancle, occupied before 648 BC, perhaps as early as 716 BC.
It was taken by the Athenians in 426 BC. The people of Rhegium planted the exiles from Naxos and Catana in 395 BC as a counterpoise to Dionysius the Elder's foundation of Tyndaris; but Dionysius soon took it. In the bay Gaius Duilius won the first Roman naval victory over the Carthaginians (260 BC).

In 36 BC the naval Battle of Mylae was fought offshore.  The fleet of Octavian, commanded by Marcus Agrippa, engaged that of Sextus Pompey.  While the battle was nearly a draw, Sextus could not replace his losses, and was thus weaker at the following Battle of Naulochus (36 BC), where he was utterly defeated.

After the fall of the Western Roman Empire, under the Byzantines, the town became one of the first episcopal seats of Sicily. In the 9th century Milazzo was conquered by the Arabs, who built the first nucleus of the castle here.
Frederick II of Hohenstaufen further fortified the town and created a personal hunting park. The castle was later mostly rebuilt in the age of Charles V of Spain.

Milazzo was also the seat of a battle in 1718 between Spain and Austria, and of another fought by Giuseppe Garibaldi against the Kingdom of Two Sicilies during his Expedition of the Thousand.

Geography
Milazzo borders with the municipalities of Barcellona Pozzo di Gotto, Merì and San Filippo del Mela.

Milazzo is the point of reference of a vast territory, from Villafranca Tirrena to Patti (over 200,000 inhabitants). Is also, an important centre of the Strait of Messina Metropolitan Area (who also includes areas of Reggio Calabria), with the nearby town Barcellona Pozzo di Gotto.

Main sights

Castle of Milazzo. Begun by the Arabs, enlarged by the Normans, restored and strengthened by Frederick II, it is surrounded by walls with round towers built under Alfonso V of Aragon, with a Gothic portal dating from the 14th century. Near the castle are the ruins of the fourteenth-century palace of the grand jury and the old cathedral (1603) probably built on a design by architect Camillo Camillians.

Other sights include:
the Church of Our Lady of Mount Carmel
the Baroque Church of the Holy Crucifix (1629), housing a wooden canopy from the 18th century and a wooden crucifix from the early 17th century.
Rock church of St. Anthony of Padua
Sanctuary of St. Francis of Paola

Economy
Over time, the town is moving forward towards the sea by recording a continuous development of agriculture and fishing activities, commercial and industrial.

Transportation

The port of Milazzo is a departure point for ferries to the Aeolian Islands and Naples.

See also
S.S. Milazzo
Taberna Mylaensis

References

External links 

 Milazzo official website

 
Coastal towns in Sicily
Municipalities of the Metropolitan City of Messina
Zanclean colonies
Colonies of Magna Graecia
Ancient Greek archaeological sites in Italy